"Saviour's Day" is a song by Cliff Richard. It was the United Kingdom Christmas number one single in 1990, the second occasion Richard had a solo Christmas number one (the first being "Mistletoe and Wine"). The video for the song was filmed in Dorset.

Composition
"Saviour's Day" was written by Chris Eaton and produced by Cliff Richard and Paul Moessl. Eaton wrote the song in October 1989, and took his original version of the song with him to a Christmas party to show to Richard. Eaton had been warned that all of Richard's songs for the following year were already booked in and there wouldn't be any space for it. However, Eaton insisted that Richard listen to the tape he brought along, and so they left the party and listened to it in Richard's Rolls-Royce. Richard immediately liked the song and predicted that it could be a number one record.

Music video
The music video for "Saviour's Day" was filmed in Dorset, in the town of Swanage and at Durdle Door. The video was shot in September 1990. Richard and the extras in the video were asked to wear winter clothes for the Christmas song, but the day's filming took place on a warm September day with blue sky and sunshine. The video featured Richard and the extras singing together on top of the limestone arch of Durdle Door.

Release and reception
In the UK, "Saviour's Day" entered the UK Singles Chart on 8 December 1990 at number six. It went to number three the following week, and up a further spot in the week before Christmas. The song went to number one on 23 December 1990, becoming that year's Christmas number one and replacing the previous week's UK number one, "Ice Ice Baby" by Vanilla Ice. A week later "Saviour's Day" dropped back down to number three, and spent only one more week in the top 40 at number twenty. The final charted spot in the top 100 was on 19 January 1991, when "Saviour's Day" was at number 53. The song was Richard's second solo Christmas number one in the UK, after "Mistletoe and Wine" in 1988.

In 2017, ShortList's Dave Fawbert listed the song as containing "one of the greatest key changes in music history".

Charts and certifications

Chart positions

Year-end charts

Certifications

References

External links
 Cliff Richard - Saviour's Day on VEVO / YouTube

1990 singles
Cliff Richard songs
UK Singles Chart number-one singles
British Christmas songs
Songs written by Chris Eaton (UK musician)
1990 songs
Christmas number-one singles in the United Kingdom